Hugh Maguire may refer to:

 Hugh Maguire (Lord of Fermanagh) (died 1600), Lord of Fermanagh in Ireland during the reign of Elizabeth I
 Hugh Maguire (athlete) (1887–1967), American olympic athlete
 Hugh Maguire (violinist) (1926–2013), Irish violinist and concertmaster
 Hugh Maguire (actor), American film and television actor